Mohammad-Javad Azari Jahromi (born 16 September 1982) is an Iranian politician and former intelligence officer who served as the Minister of Information and Communications Technology in the administration of President Hassan Rouhani from 2017 to 2021.

He gained vote of confidence from the parliament on 20 August 2017, with 152 yeas, 120 nays, 7 abstentions and 9 invalid votes.

He is currently the youngest member of the cabinet of Iran, as well as the first Iranian minister born after the Iranian Revolution.

Early life and education 
Azari Jahromi was born in Jahrom, Fars Province and was raised in a poor family. During the Iran-Iraq War, his 16-year-old brother was killed. He studied electrical engineering at the Power and Water University of Technology, where he met his future wife.

Career 
Azari Jahromi worked at the Ministry of Intelligence from 2002 to 2009, where he for some time held managerial positions and was involved in crackdown of 2009 election protests. From 2009 to 2014, he served as general manager of the communications systems security department at the Communication Regulatory Authority. He then became ex-officio vice minister of information and communications technology, in his capacity as the chairman of Telecommunications Infrastructure Company. Jahrami was also a non-executive member of the board of directors at RighTel between 2014 and 2016.

In November 2019, the U.S. Treasury Department sanctioned Azari "for his role in the Iranian regime’s widescale internet censorship," freezing any of his U.S. assets and banning U.S. persons from doing business with him.

References

 

1982 births
Living people
People from Jahrom
People of the Ministry of Intelligence (Iran)
Communications ministers
Iranian individuals subject to the U.S. Department of the Treasury sanctions
Specially Designated Nationals and Blocked Persons List